Irrational fear may refer to:
 Irrational fear (phobia), any of several anxiety disorders
 Irrational fear (unknown), fear of the unknown

See also
 Phobia (disambiguation)
 Unknown (disambiguation)